Robert Pursglove (alias "Sylvester"; 1504–1579) was an English sixteenth-century bishop.

Life

He was born in Tideswell, Derbyshire,  the son of Adam Pursglove; his mother's name was Bradshawe.  By a maternal uncle, William Bradshawe, he was sent to St Paul's School, London, where he spent nine years. He became an Augustinian canon regular, after a short spell at St. Mary Overy, then a priory, he went on to Corpus Christi College, Oxford. He remained in Oxford until about 1532. He was Prior of Gisborough, by about 1534. The king appointed him suffragan Bishop of Hull in 1538. In 1540, he surrendered Gisborough Priory to the king, and was given a pension.

He was made provost of Jesus College, Rotherham in 1544. It was suppressed early in the reign of Edward VI, and he became then Archdeacon of Nottingham. His tenure of the bishopric of Hull continued under Robert Holgate and Nicholas Heath; but he was deprived of the office, as well as of his archdeaconry, in 1559 for refusing to take the oath of supremacy.

In 1559, the year of his deprivation, he obtained letters patent from Elizabeth I to found a grammar school at Tideswell. On 5 June 1563, he also obtained letters patent to found a similar school, bearing the same name, and also a hospital, or almshouse, at Guisborough.

Pursglove resided in his last years partly at Tideswell and partly at Dunston in the same county. He died on 2 May 1579, and was buried in Tideswell church where a memorial brass in the floor shows him dressed as a bishop in alb, stole and chasuble (robes worn up to the reign of Mary I, but banned under the Elizabethan Church Settlement).

Prior Pursglove College, a sixth form college in Guisborough, North Yorkshire, is named in his memory. At some point or other, he used the alias "Sylvester".

Notes

References

1504 births
1579 deaths
People from Tideswell
Alumni of Corpus Christi College, Oxford
Archdeacons of Nottingham
16th-century English bishops
Bishops of Hull
People associated with the Dissolution of the Monasteries